Kolgaküla is a village in Kuusalu Parish, Harju County in northern Estonia, on the territory of Lahemaa National Park. The Valgejõgi River passes Kolgaküla on its eastern side.

References

Villages in Harju County